Valcour Island is a  island in Lake Champlain in Clinton County, New York, United States.  The island is mostly in the Town of Peru and partly in the Town of Plattsburgh, southeast of the City of Plattsburgh. It is within the boundaries of the Adirondack Park.

Description
Its shores are alternately rocky, craggy outcroppings and sandy beaches. Several protected bays provide anchorages. The Bluff Point Light stands on the western shore. It guided boats through the narrow strait from 1871 until 1930 when it was replaced by a steel tower.

It is the fourth-largest island in Lake Champlain. The only larger Islands are Grand Isle, North Hero and Isle la Motte, all part of Vermont.

The island contains part of an exposed Ordovician fossil reef, and was dedicated as part of the Chazy Fossil Reef National Natural Landmark in 2009.

History
On October 11, 1776, a naval engagement known as the Battle of Valcour Island between British and United States naval forces under Benedict Arnold was fought in the strait adjacent to the island.

Valcour was the site of several farms and summer homes (and one short-lived utopian community, the Dawn Valcour Society) from the nineteenth century until the 1970s, when New York State completed its purchase of the island. The island is now within the Adirondack Park, and is managed by the New York State Department of Environmental Conservation as the "Valcour Island Primitive Area".

References

External links
  Valcour Island information
  Battle of Valcour Island
  Valcour Island Heritage Trail Brochure

Islands of Clinton County, New York
Islands of Lake Champlain
Lake islands of New York (state)
Islands of New York (state)